Federico Molero Giménez (11 January 1908, Almería – 1969, Madrid) was a Spanish physicist and inventor, who made pioneering studies of the potential of solar energy for human use. During the Spanish Civil War, he played an important part in the two year Republican defense of Madrid through his work on the city's defenses.

1908 births
1969 deaths
Spanish physicists
20th-century Spanish inventors
Spanish republicans